Little Boy is the eighth album of singer/actor/host Janno Gibbs. This 10-track album was produced and released by GMA Records in November, 2007.

In mid-2008, GMA Records released a special edition album of Little Boy which contain additional two tracks, Lupin the theme song of the action-adventure series of the same title, written by Janno Gibbs himself and featuring actress Ara Mina; and the revival Muli (Again), a Vehnee Saturno composition, which is also the theme song of an afternoon drama of the same title.

Track listing

See also
 GMA Records
 Janno Gibbs
 Seven

References

2007 albums
Soul albums
Janno Gibbs albums
GMA Music albums